Jamila Woods (born October 6, 1989) is a Chicago-based American singer, songwriter and poet. Woods is a graduate of St. Ignatius College Prep and Brown University, where she received a BA in Africana Studies and Theater & Performance Studies. Her work focuses on themes of Black ancestry, Black feminism, and Black identity, with recurring emphases on self-love and the City of Chicago.

Career

Poetry 
In 2012, Jamila Woods published her first chapbook, entitled The Truth About Dolls. Her work can be found in the anthologies The Breakbeat Poets: New American Poetry in the Age of Hip-Hop (2015), Courage: Daring Poems for Gutsy Girls (2014), and The UnCommon Core: Contemporary Poems for Learning & Living (2013). Her influences include Lucille Clifton, Gwendolyn Brooks, Toni Morrison, and Frida Kahlo.

Woods was also one of three editors of The Breakbeat Poets Volume II, entitled Black Girl Magic. The 2018 publication is an anthology of poetry by contemporary Black women, “exploring themes of beauty, unapologetic blackness, intersectionality, self-definition, and more.” Woods is a member of the Dark Noise Poetry Collective with fellow creatives Fatimah Asghar, Franny Choi, Nate Marshall, Aaron Samuels, and Danez Smith.

Community organizing 
Woods is the Associate Artistic Director of Young Chicago Authors (YCA), an organization in the Chicago area dedicated to uplifting youth voices through arts, education, and mentorship. Through YCA, Woods helps to organize Louder Than a Bomb, the world's largest youth poetry slam festival. She also facilitates poetry workshops and creates curriculum for Chicago Public Schools. While in Providence, Woods served as a volunteer at non-profit arts center New Urban Arts.

Music 
After completing studies at Brown, Woods and classmate Owen Hill formed soul-pop band Milo and Otis, or M&O, which released two albums: The Joy in 2012 and Almost Us in 2014. The song "Lift Up" on the band's debut album features Chance the Rapper. M&O disbanded in 2014. Woods is widely known for her other collaborative works with Chance the Rapper on the hit song "Sunday Candy" from the album Surf as well as "Blessings" from Coloring Book. Woods is also featured on the Macklemore & Ryan Lewis song "White Privilege II". In January 2016, Woods signed to Chicago's independent hip-hop label, Closed Sessions. In that same year Woods released her debut solo album titled, “HEAVN”. Follo,ing that album in May 2019, she released the album, “LEGACY! LEGACY!” Each song is named after a prolific black creator.

In early 2020, Woods performed as the opening act for the R&B singer Raphael Saadiq's Jimmy Lee Tour.

Written Works

Poems 

 “Frida Kahlo to Diego,” or “the ways my body feels empty sometimes”, Muzzle Magazine, 2012,
 "Pigeon Man", Radius Lit, 2012
 "Daddy Dozens", Poetry Foundation, 2015
 "beverly, huh.", Poetry Foundation, 2015
 "coconut oil kind of woman", Winter Tangerine Review: Hands Up Don’t Shoot, 2015
 "bird's nest", Winter Tangerine Review: Hands Up Don’t Shoot, 2015 
 "in security or on being touched without permission", Winter Tangerine Review: Hands Up Don’t Shoot, 2015 
 "how our hair got this way", Winter Tangerine Review: Hands Up Don’t Shoot, 2015 
 "Blk Grl Art", The Offing, 2016
 "Ghazal for White Hen Pantry", Poetry Foundation, 2015
 "Ode to Herb Kent", Poetry Foundation, 2015

Plays 

 "theSHARK", Muzzle Magazine, 2012

Anthologies 

 The UnCommon Core: Contemporary Poems for Learning Living (2013)
 Courage: Daring Poems for Gutsy Girls (2014) 
 The Breakbeat Poets: New American Poetry in the Age of Hip-Hop (2015) 
 The BreakBeat Poets: Black Girl Magic (2018)
 The End of Chiraq: A Literary Mixtape (2018)

Chapbooks 

 Monsters of Metal, 2010
 The Truth About Dolls, 2012

Music videos 
 "Blk Girl Soldier" (2016)
 "Holy" (2017)
 "LSD ft. Chance The Rapper" (2017)
 "GIOVANNI" (2018)
 "ZORA" (2019)
 "EARTHA" (2019)
 "BALDWIN" (2019)
 "SULA (Hardcover)" (2020)

Discography

Studio albums

Singles 
 "Blk Girl Soldier" (2016)
 "Holy" (2017)
 "LSD" feat. Chance the Rapper [RP Boo Remix] (2017)
 "Giovanni" (2018)
 "Zora" (2019)
 "Eartha" (2019)
 "Baldwin" (2019)
 "Zora" [Live] (2020)
 "Sula" [Hardcover] (2020)
 "Sula" [Paperback] (2020)

Heavn 
Woods released her debut album Heavn on her SoundCloud page on July 11, 2016 to critical acclaim. The album features collaborations with Chance the Rapper, Noname, Saba, Lorine Chia, Kweku Collins and Donnie Trumpet.  Heavn was ranked as the 36th best album of 2016 by Pitchfork.  Heavn features a variety of producers, including oddCouple, a fellow Closed Sessions signee who produced five of the album's 12 tracks. In 2017, Woods partners with Jagjaguwar and Closed Sessions to re-release the album.

Legacy! Legacy! 
Jamila released her second album Legacy! Legacy! via Jagjaguwar on May 10, 2019 to rave reviews.   The album features collaborations with Nitty Scott, Saba, theMIND, Jasminfire, and Nico Segal. Legacy! Legacy!   includes hook song "Eartha" that assists in displaying the history and lineage of a country obsessed with forgetting. Released along with "Legacy! Legacy!" were videos for her songs "SONIA/FRIDA".

References

External links
 (music)
 (poetry)
Milo & Otis Bandcamp Page (music)

1989 births
Living people
African-American people
American women hip hop singers
American women poets
American neo soul singers
Place of birth missing (living people)
Brown University people
Brown University alumni
Jagjaguwar artists
St. Ignatius College Prep alumni
African-American women musicians
21st-century African-American people
21st-century African-American women
20th-century African-American people
20th-century African-American women